Aldo Pruna Díaz (born 12 May 1983, in Cienfuegos) is a Cuban sprint canoer who has competed since the mid-2000s. He won a silver in the C-1 500 m event at the 2007 Pan American Games in Rio de Janeiro.

Pruno also competed in two Summer Olympics, he earned his best finish of ninth in the C-1 1000 m event at Beijing in 2008.

References
Sports-Reference.com profile

1983 births
Canoeists at the 2004 Summer Olympics
Canoeists at the 2007 Pan American Games
Canoeists at the 2008 Summer Olympics
Cuban male canoeists
Living people
Olympic canoeists of Cuba
Pan American Games silver medalists for Cuba
Pan American Games medalists in canoeing
Central American and Caribbean Games gold medalists for Cuba
Competitors at the 2006 Central American and Caribbean Games
Central American and Caribbean Games medalists in canoeing
Medalists at the 2007 Pan American Games
People from Cienfuegos
21st-century Cuban people